Rehema is 2017 Ugandan film directed by Allan Manzi based upon a screenplay by Usama Mukwaya starring Juliet Zansaanze, Raymond Rushabiro and Ismael Ssesanga. The film premiered at the 38th Durban International Film Festival in South Africa. It held a special screening at the 4th Edition of the Euro-Uganda Film Festival on 17 June 2018 courtesy of the British Council.

Plot 
Rehema (Juliet Zansaanze) is in love with Sula (Ismael Ssesanga) but secretively her uncle (Raymond Rushabiro) and grandfather are plotting to marry her to someone else older because of his money. She powerfully rejects the marriage but an accident happens while fighting with her uncle and he dies leaving her imprisoned for Murder. Rehema now has to face the force of law while she fights for justice and her dreams.

Cast 
 Juliet Zansaanze as Rehema
 Raymond Rushabiro as Hakim
 Ismael Ssesanga as Sula
 Eddy Mulindwa as Mzee
 Allen Musumba as Friend
 Veronica Nakayo as Counsel

Production
Principal photography on Rehema began early 2016.

Awards

Won
 2017: Best Short Film, Uganda Film Festival

Nominated
 2017: Best Short Film, 7th Pearl International Film Festival
 2018: Best Short Film, Amakula International Film Festival
 2018: Best Short Film, Viewer's Choice Movie Awards
 2018: Costume Design, Viewer's Choice Movie Awards
 2018: Best Actress, Viewer's Choice Movie Awards
 2018: Best Short Film, Nador Cinema Festival

References

External links 
 
 Official Facebook

Ugandan short films
Films shot in Uganda
Films produced by Usama Mukwaya
Films with screenplays by Usama Mukwaya
O Studios Entertainment films
Ugandan drama films